Lepidomeniidae is a family of molluscs belonging to the order Pholidoskepia.

Genera:
 Lepidomenia Kowalevsky, 1883
 Nierstrassia Heath, 1918
 Tegulaherpia Salvini-Plawen, 1983

References

Pholidoskepia
Mollusc families